Dybowo  is a village in the administrative district of Gmina Prostki, within Ełk County, Warmian-Masurian Voivodeship, in northern Poland.

The village has a population of 110.

References

Villages in Ełk County